Al-Haj FAW Motors Limited is a Pakistani automobile manufacturer based in Karachi, Pakistan since 2013. It is a subsidiary of Chinese assembler and manufacturer of FAW Group. The company assembles passenger and commercial vehicles at its assembly plant in Karachi.

Al-Haj FAW Motors Limited was incorporated as a private limited company in October 2006.

Al-Haj FAW Motors is the sole distributor & progressive manufacturer / assembler of FAW heavy commercial vehicles, light commercial vehicles & passenger cars in Pakistan.

First CBU (Complete Built-Up) product-line of HVs was launched in 2006 which included different heavy commercial vehicles like dump trucks, rigid trucks & prime movers.

The local production CKD (Complete Knocked-Down) of FAW Heavy Commercial Vehicles started in December 2011.

Light Vehicles, Mini Van & Pickup (CBU) were introduced in March 2012 and regular (CKD) production of minivans (XPV) and pick-up trucks (Carrier) was started in September 2012.

In August 2017, Al-Haj FAW Motors launched Pakistan’s first locally assembled Chinese passenger car, the FAW V2.

Operations in Pakistan 
FAW used to manufacture a wide range of vehicles to cater to all transportation needs, including passenger cars. The Al-Haj group had introduced FAW's heavy-duty trucks as completely built-up units (CBUs) initially. The response from transporters was positive, so the range of trucks was expanded to meet the needs of all cargo segments, including medium and light-duty commercial vehicles.  

In 2017, JS Bank Limited collaborated with Al-Haj FAW Motors Private Limited to provide business loans to customers of light commercial vehicles through the Prime Minister Youth Business Loan (PMYBL) scheme.

Products

Passenger vehicles

FAW V2 (Subcompact city car)
FAW XP-V (Minivan)

Commercial vehicles
FAW Carrier (Light Truck)
FAW Tiger V (Medium Truck)
FAW Super Plus J5M (Heavy Truck)
FAW Tornado J5P (Heavy Truck)

References

Car manufacturers of Pakistan
Truck manufacturers of Pakistan
Manufacturing companies based in Karachi
Vehicle manufacturing companies established in 2013
FAW Group brands
Pakistani subsidiaries of foreign companies
Pakistani companies established in 2013